Purpuradusta fimbriata, common name : the fringed cowry, is a species of sea snail, a cowry, a marine gastropod mollusk in the family Cypraeidae, the cowries.

Subspecies
The following subspecies are recognized :
Purpuradusta fimbriata durbanensis (Schilder & Schilder, 1938) (synonyms : Cypraea fimbriata durbanensis (Schilder & Schilder, 1938); Palmadusta fimbriata durbanensis Schilder & Schilder, 1938)
forma : Purpuradusta fimbriata durbanensis quasigracilis (f) Lorenz, F. Jr., 1989 
forma : Purpuradusta fimbriata unifasciata waikikiensis (f) Schilder, F.A., 1933
Purpuradusta fimbriata fimbriata (Gmelin, 1791)
Purpuradusta fimbriata marquesana Lorenz, 2002 
Purpuradusta fimbriata quasigracilis Lorenz, 1989
Purpuradusta fimbriata unifasciata (Mighels, J.W., 1845)
Purpuradusta fimbriata waikikiensis Schilder, 1933

Description
The shell size varies between 7 mm and 21 mm

Distribution
This species and its subspecies occur in the Red Sea and in the Indian Ocean off Aldabra, Chagos, the Comores, Kenya, Madagascar, the Mascarene Basin, Mauritius, Mozambique, Réunion, the Seychelles, Somalia and Tanzania; in the Pacific Ocean off Japan.

References

 Verdcourt, B. (1954). The cowries of the East African Coast (Kenya, Tanganyika, Zanzibar and Pemba). Journal of the East Africa Natural History Society 22(4) 96: 129–144, 17 pls.
 Burgess, C.M. (1970). The Living Cowries. AS Barnes and Co, Ltd. Cranbury, New Jersey

External links
 Gastropods.com : Purpuradusta fimbriata fimbriata; accessed : 26 January 2011

Cypraeidae
Gastropods described in 1791
Taxa named by Johann Friedrich Gmelin